"Lover Alot" is a single by American hard rock band Aerosmith that was released August 22, 2012. It is included on Aerosmith's 15th studio album, Music from Another Dimension!.
The song floated to and premiered on radio stations throughout North America a week before being released as a single.
Along with the album, the song was then officially released on November 6, 2012.  The song is notable for featuring the Aerosmith songwriting debut of two people: Jesse Sky Kramer (son of Joey Kramer) and Marco Moir (Brad Whitford's guitar technician).

On January 25, 2013, it was announced that the song would be coming to Rock Band 3 as Downloadable Content along with five other Aerosmith songs as part of the "Aerosmith's Greatest Dimension" pack.  The pack was released on January 29, 2013.

Charts

References

2012 singles
Aerosmith songs
Songs written by Steven Tyler
Songs written by Brad Whitford
Songs written by Joey Kramer
Songs written by Marti Frederiksen
Columbia Records singles
American hard rock songs
Songs written by Joe Perry (musician)
Songs written by Tom Hamilton (musician)
2012 songs